Carolyn Mehaffey is an American rower. In the 1986 World Rowing Championships she won gold in the women's lightweight coxless four event.

References

American female rowers
World Rowing Championships medalists for the United States
Year of birth missing (living people)
Living people
21st-century American women